The 1958 United States Senate election in Texas was held on November 4, 1958. Incumbent Democratic U.S. Senator Ralph Yarborough won a competitive primary against former Senator William Blakley and handily defeated newspaper publisher Roy Whittenburg in the general election.

Democratic primary

Candidates
William Blakley, former interim Senator (1957)
Ralph Yarborough, incumbent Senator since 1957

Results

General election

Results

See also 
 1958 United States Senate elections

References

Texas
1958
Senate